https://www.thegreatsimplification.com/episode/53-william-rees

William Rees, FRSC (born December 18, 1943), is Professor Emeritus at the University of British Columbia and former director of the School of Community and Regional Planning (SCARP) at UBC.

Rees taught at the University of British Columbia from 1969–70 until his retirement in 2011–12, but has since continued his writing and research. His primary interest is in public policy and planning relating to global environmental trends and the ecological conditions for sustainable socioeconomic development.  He is the originator of the "ecological footprint" concept and co-developer of the method.

Background
William Rees received his PhD degree in population ecology from the University of Toronto.  He founded SCARP's '"Environment and Resource Planning" concentration and from 1994 to 1999 served as director of the School.  Rees' book on ecological footprint analysis, Our Ecological Footprint (co-authored with then PhD student Dr Mathis Wackernagel), was published in 1996 and is now available in English, Chinese, French, German, Hungarian, Italian, Japanese, Latvian, and Spanish.

Much of Rees' work is in the realm of ecological economics and human ecology including behavioural and cultural barriers to sustainability.  He is best known in these fields for the co-development of ecological footprint analysis with his then PhD student Mathis Wackernagel.  The ecological footprint is a quantitative tool that estimates humanity's ecological impact on the ecosphere in terms of appropriated ecosystem (land and water) area. This research reveals the fundamental incompatibility between continued material economic growth and ecological security, and has helped to reopen debate on human carrying capacity as a consideration in sustainable development.

Academic, policy and research interests
Rees is a founding member and recent past-President of the Canadian Society for Ecological Economics. He is also a Fellow at the Post Carbon Institute, a co-investigator in the "Global Integrity Project" aimed at defining the ecological and political requirements for biodiversity preservation, a founding director of the One Earth Initiative and a Director of the Real Green New Deal project. A dynamic speaker, Rees has been invited to lecture on areas of his expertise across Canada and the US, as well as in Australia, Austria, Belgium, China, Finland, France, Germany, Hungary, Japan, Mexico, the Netherlands, Norway, Indonesia, Italy, Korea, the former Soviet Union, Spain, Sri Lanka, Sweden and the UK.

Rees' academic interests are in the following subject matter fields:
Human bio-ecology and the ecological basis of civilization including the role of energy in the expansion/sustainability of the human enterprise.
Ecological economics: Biophysical realities in resource allocation and distribution
Global change and the dynamics of societal collapse.
Why high intelligence (e.g., the capacity for logical thought and reasoning from the evidence) plays so small a role in societal decision-making particularly pertaining to sustainability.

Philosophy

Rees has said that the "enlightenment project," rooted as it is in Cartesian dualism, has resulted in a techno-industrial society that sees itself as somehow separate from the biophysical world.  This dualism and its expansionary-materialist worldview are the basis of many of the "environmental problems" facing humankind.

Awards and honours
Most recently Prof Rees has received a Dean's Medal of Distinction (UBC Faculty of Applied Science 2016) and the 2015 Herman Daly Award in Ecological Economics (USSEE). In 2012 he was awarded the 2012 Blue Planet Prize (jointly with Dr Mathis Wackernagel), the 2012 Kenneth Boulding Prize in Ecological Economics (ISEE), and an honorary Doctoral Degree, Laval University. Previously he was a recipient of a 2007 Trudeau Fellowship, an annual prize awarded by the Pierre Elliott Trudeau Foundation "...in recognition of outstanding achievement, innovative approaches to issues of public policy and commitment to public engagement", and in 2006 he was elected as a Fellow of the Royal Society of Canada (FRSC). Rees was a member of the winning team receiving the City of Barcelona 2004 Award (Multimedia Category) for the exhibition Inhabiting the World. In 2000, The Vancouver Sun recognized him as one of British Columbia's top "public intellectuals."  In 1997, UBC awarded William Rees a Senior Killam Research Prize.

References

Representative publications
 Rees, W.E. 2020  “MegaCities at Risk: The Climate–Energy Conundrum”, chapter in: Sorensen, A and Labbe, D (eds.) The International Handbook on Megacities and Megacity Regions. Cheltenham: Edward Elgar.
 Rees, W.E. 2020.  “Scorched Earth”, foreword to H. Washington, What Can I do to Help Heal the Environmental Crisis, London: Earthscan (Routledge), p. xxii-xxvi. 
 Rees, W.E. 2020   “Ecological economics for humanity’s plague phase”. Ecological Economics 169 (March 2020)  https://doi.org/10.1016/j.ecolecon.2019.106519  
 Rees, W.E. 2019.  “Avoiding the ‘Endarkenment’”, foreword to J Bell and J Marlow, Sketches of the History of Science, Montreal: Champlain St-Lambert, p. ix –xi.
 Rees, W.E. 2019  “Why place-based food systems? Food security in a chaotic world”. Journal of Agriculture, Food Systems, and Community Development, 9(Suppl. 1), 5–13. https://doi.org/10.5304/jafscd.2019.091.014
 Rees, W.E. 2019  “End Game – The economy as eco-catastrophe and what needs to change”. Real-World Economics Review ( March 2019) at http://www.paecon.net/PAEReview/issue87/Rees87.pdf
 Rees, W.E. 2018. “Planning in the Anthropocene”, Chapter 5 in: M Gunder, A Madinipour and V Watson (eds), The Routledge Handbook of Planning Theory. New York: Routledge.
 Rees, W.E. 2017.  “Going Down? Human Nature, Growth and (Un)sustainability,” Chapter 22 in: PA Victor, B Dolter (eds), Handbook on Growth and Sustainability. Cheltenham, UK: Edward Elgar.
 Rees, W.E. 2013.  “Ecological Footprint, Concept of.” In: Levin S.A. (ed.) Encyclopedia of Biodiversity, second edition, Vol. 2: 701–713. Waltham, MA: Academic Press.
 Rees, W.E. 2010. “What’s Blocking Sustainability? Human nature, cognition and denial”.  Sustainability: Science, Practice & Policy 6(2):13-25. http://sspp.proquest.com/archives/vol6iss2/1001-012.rees.html (Accessed 18 Dec 2010).
 Rees, W.E. 2010. “True Cost Economics”. Chapter in the Berkshire Encyclopedia of Sustainability, Vol 2, The Business of Sustainability. C. Lazlo et al. eds. Berkshire Publishing Group.
 Rees, W.E. 2010  “The Roots of Our Crises: Does Human Nature Drive Us Toward Collapse?” Chapter 6 in: D Lerch (ed), The Community Resilience Reader. Washington, Island Press (for the Post Carbon Institute.) 
 Rees, W.E. 2006. "Ecological Footprints and Bio-Capacity: Essential Elements in Sustainability Assessment." Chapter 9 in Jo Dewulf and Herman Van Langenhove (eds) Renewables-Based Technology: Sustainability Assessment, pp. 143–158. Chichester, UK: John Wiley and Sons.
 Rees, W.E. 2006. "Why Conventional Economic Logic Won't Protect Biodiversity." Chapter 14 in D.M. Lavigne (ed.). Gaining Ground: In Pursuit of Ecological Sustainability, pp. 207–226. International Fund for Animal Welfare, Guelph, Canada, and the University of Limerick, Limerick, Ireland.
 Rees, W.E. 2004." Is Humanity Fatally Successful?" Journal of Business Administration and Policy Analysis 30-31: 67-100 (2002–2003).
 Rees, W.E. 2003. "Understanding Urban Ecosystems: An Ecological Economics Perspective." Chapter in Alan Berkowitz et al.eds., Understanding Urban Ecosystems. New York: Springer-Verlag.
 Rees, W.E. 2002. "Globalization and Sustainability: Conflict or Convergence?" Bulletin of Science, Technology and Society 22 (4): 249–268.
 Rees, W.E. 1992. "Ecological Footprints and Appropriated Carrying Capacity: What Urban Economics Leaves Out." Environment and Urbanization 4 (2): 121–130.
 Moore, J and W.E. Rees. 2013.  “Getting to One Planet Living”. Chapter 4 in: State of the World 2013 – Is Sustainability Still Possible? Washington, World Watch Institute. 
 Kissinger, M. & W.E. Rees. 2010. “An interregional ecological approach for modelling sustainability in a globalizing world—Reviewing existing approaches and emerging directions.”  Ecological Modelling 221(21):2615-2623.
 Kissinger, M & W.E. Rees. 2010. “Importing terrestrial biocapacity: The U.S. case and global implications.” Land Use Policy 27: 589–599.
 Kissinger, M & W.E. Rees. 2009. “Footprints on the Prairies: Degradation and Sustainability of Canadian Agriculture in a Globalizing world.” Ecological Economics 68: 2309–2315
 Wackernagel, M. and W. Rees. 1996.  Our Ecological Footprint: Reducing Human Impact on the Earth. New Society Publishers.

External links
Video of talk for the World Federalist Movement Vancouver, Canada; April 2010
Post Carbon Institute

The Great Simplification podcast (Jan 2023): William E. Rees: “The Fundamental Issue – Overshoot”

Living people
Canadian ecologists
University of Toronto alumni
Academic staff of the University of British Columbia
Sustainability advocates
1943 births
Ecological economists
Human ecologists
Environmental planners
Fellows of the Royal Society of Canada